Espinas is a surname.  Notable people with the surname include:

Alfred Espinas (1844–1922), French philosopher
Gabby Espinas (born 1982), Filipino basketball player

See also
Espinas, a commune in southern France
Espina